The 2019 Kiskút Open was a professional tennis tournament played on indoor clay courts. It was the first edition of the tournament which was part of the 2019 ITF Women's World Tennis Tour. It took place in Székesfehérvár, Hungary between 14 and 20 October 2019.

Singles main-draw entrants

Seeds

 1 Rankings are as of 7 October 2019.

Other entrants
The following players received wildcards into the singles main draw:
  Gréta Arn
  Dorka Drahota-Szabó
  Dalma Gálfi
  Adrienn Nagy

The following player received entry using a protected ranking:
  Susanne Celik

The following players received entry from the qualifying draw:
  Lea Bošković
  Nicoleta Dascălu
  Georgina García Pérez
  Ilona Georgiana Ghioroaie
  Nina Potočnik
  Daniela Seguel
  Simona Waltert
  Maryna Zanevska

Champions

Singles

 Nicoleta Dascălu def.  Irina Bara, 7–5, 6–2

Doubles

 Irina Bara /  Maryna Zanevska def.  Akgul Amanmuradova /  Elena Bogdan, 3–6, 6–2, [10–8]

References

External links
 2019 Kiskút Open at ITFtennis.com
 Official website

2019 ITF Women's World Tennis Tour
2019 in Hungarian tennis
October 2019 sports events in Europe